Armandt Koster (born 20 January 1990) is a South African professional rugby union player. His regular position is flanker or lock.

Career

Youth and Varsity Cup rugby

Koster was included in the  squad for the 2011 Under-21 Provincial Championship, but didn't make any appearances for them. In 2012, he was included in the  squad for the 2012 Varsity Cup. He returned to make two substitute appearances during the 2013 Varsity Cup and started in five matches for Shimlas during the 2014 Varsity Cup.

Free State

After his first season of Varsity Cup rugby, he was included in the  squad for the 2012 Vodacom Cup.

Griffons

Koster joined Welkom-based side  for the 2012 Currie Cup First Division competition. Three more appearances off the bench followed before Koster started the final two matches of the season, both of those against the  – first a 39–29 victory for the Griffons in the final match of the regular season and then in the semi-final, where the Griffons lost 37–30.

Koster started five matches for the Griffons during the 2013 Vodacom Cup competition and returned for the 2014 Vodacom Cup competition, where he made three appearances. The Griffons finished third in the competition to remain in the First Division in 2014.

He played the full 80 minutes of the match as the Griffons ran out 23–21 winners to win their first silverware for six years.

Shortly after the conclusion of the 2014 Currie Cup First Division, Koster was also included in the ' wider training squad as part of their preparations for the 2015 Super Rugby season.

Grenoble

Koster joined French Pro D2 side , but failed a medical when he was diagnosed with a cervical disc herniation and returned to South Africa for surgery.

References

South African rugby union players
Living people
1990 births
People from Vryheid
Rugby union locks
Rugby union flankers
Free State Cheetahs players
Griffons (rugby union) players
Rugby union players from KwaZulu-Natal